Bhagavadajjukam is a 2021 Indian Sanskrit-language film directed by Yadu Vijayakrishnan.

Bhagavadajjukam is an adaptation of the 7th century play by Bodhayana of the same name. The film had its world premiere at the International Film Festival of India. Bhagavadajjukam also won Kerala Film Critics Award for Best Sanskrit film.

Synopsis
Shandilya is the disciple of Parivrajaka, a Buddhist monk. He comes across with Vasanthasena, a courtesan. Vasanthasena dies on spot as a result of Yamadoota's carelessness. Witnessing Shandilya's lamentation, Parivrajaka transfers his soul to the body of Vasanthasena. What ensues is nothing but series of humorous events. The satirical story features the collision of two worlds.

Cast
Pradeep Kumar as Parivrajaka
Jishnu V Nair as Shandilya
Parvathy V Nair as Vasanthasena
Saji Sopanam as Yamadoota
Shivakumar as Vaidya
Reshmi Kailas as the mother
Jwala S Parameswar as Madhukarika

See also 
 Sanskrit cinema

References 

Sanskrit-language films
2021 films